was the governor of Hiroshima Prefecture from 1973 to 1981 and justice minister from 1995 to 1996.

Biography
Miyazawa was born in 1921. He was the younger brother of Kiichi Miyazawa.

He was elected as governor of Hiroshima in December 1973 for the Liberal Democratic Party, and defeated the Japanese Communist Party candidate Noriaki Yamada. As governor he advocated greater autonomy for local governors.

On 9 October 1996, he was appointed minister of justice and replaced Tomoharu Tazawa in the post. During his tenure Miyazawa tried to use the anti-subversion law against the Aum Shinrikyo sect.

In September 2000, as a private citizen, Miyazawa penned an article in Asahi Shimbun, in which he criticized local authorities in Japan for refusing to enroll children of Aum Shinrikyo members in schools.

References

|-

|-

|-

1921 births
2012 deaths
People from Hiroshima
Governors of Hiroshima
Ministers of Justice of Japan
Hiroshi